"Is This How You Feel?" is a song recorded by Australian indie rock band the Preatures, released in May 2013 as the lead single from their second extended play of the same name (2013).

In January 2014, "Is This How You Feel?" was voted number 9 in the Triple J Hottest 100, 2013, and following this result, debuted and peaked at number 46 on the ARIA Singles Chart in February 2014. It was certified platinum in Australia in 2018. 

The song won first place at the 2013 Vanda & Young Global Songwriting Competition.

Reception
Sarah Guppy from Tone Deaf called the song a "summery laid-back groove" adding "delightful crisp vocals and transient beats will have you hitting repeat on this funky tune."

Mark Pytlik from Pitchfork said the song "is a clear departure from their early material, showcasing a newfound dedication to rhythm and restraint" concluding saying "'Is This How You Feel?' is a mid-tempo, feel-good, groove-based confection that explodes into one of the year's best choruses."

Credits and personnel
The Preatures
 Isabella Manfredi – lead vocals, writing, keyboards
 Jack Moffitt – guitar, writing
 Thomas Champion – bass guitar, writing
 Luke Davison – drums, writing
 Gideon Bensen – writing, guitar

Charts

Certifications

References

External links
 

2013 singles
2013 songs
The Preatures songs
Songs written by Isabella Manfredi
Vanda & Young Global Songwriting Competition Winning Songs